Eremobates affinis is a species of camel spider in the family Eremobatidae.

References

Solifugae
Articles created by Qbugbot
Animals described in 1899